Budapest Spring Festival (Hungarian: Budapesti Tavaszi Fesztivál) is the major arts festival of Budapest, Hungary, sponsored by the city government.

The festival is focused on traditional arts and is larger than its sister event the Budapest Autumn Festival, which is primarily for modern and avant-garde performances.

References

External links
 Budapest Spring Festival website

Year of establishment missing
Events in Budapest
Festivals in Hungary
Arts festivals in Hungary
Arts in Hungary